Andrew Pringle (born 7 February 1978) is a South African cricketer. He played in thirteen first-class and five List A matches from 2000 to 2003.

References

External links
 

1978 births
Living people
South African cricketers
Boland cricketers
Border cricketers